The Shibsa River is located in western Bangladesh, and is about 100 km long. The river forms much of the boundary between Paikgachha and Dacope upazilas. Inside the Sundarbans Reserve Forest, it meets the Pasur River, then separates again near Mongla, before reaching the Bay of Bengal.

References

Rivers of Bangladesh
Khulna District
Rivers of Khulna Division